San Pablo is a rapid transit complex in the Santiago Metro, located in Lo Prado. Lines 1 and 5 stop there, being the western terminus of the former.

Opening on 15 September 1975 for the Line 1, as part of the inaugural section of the line between San Pablo and La Moneda, San Pablo is one of the oldest stations in the system, and the Line 1 station is the only one in the system located in a short open cut section ending at each platform's end. The Line 5 station was opened on 12 January 2010 as part of the extension of the line from Quinta Normal to Pudahuel.

On October 19, 2019, in the framework of the protests in Chile, the station corresponding to line 1 suffered a fire that severely charred it, including an NS-2007 that was parked on the platforms. The station for line 5 was reopened on December 30, 2019, while the station for line 1 was reopened on July 25, 2020.

Etymology
The station is near the San Pablo avenue, which was the main road to Valparaíso prior to the opening of CH-68 freeway, giving its name. During the building the station was thought to be named in memoriam of folk singer-songwriter Violeta Parra.

References

Santiago Metro stations
Railway stations opened in 1975
Railway stations opened in 2010
1975 establishments in Chile
2010 establishments in Chile
Santiago Metro Line 1
Santiago Metro Line 5